Razmeghan (also Romanized as Razmeghān, Razmegān, Rakzaman, Rāzmakān, Razmaqān, and Razmqān) is a village in Golian Rural District, in the Central District of Shirvan County, North Khorasan Province, Iran. At the 2006 census, its population was 949, in 237 families.

References 

Populated places in Shirvan County